Che Mah (15 April 1838 - 21 March 1926) was a Chinese dwarf.

Biography 
In 1881, he was brought to the United States, where he would travel with Barnum and Bailey Circus. When he travelled with shows, he was considered the most polite & most intelligent dwarf on exhibition.

Later life 
When Che Mah had retired, he had moved to Knox, Indiana, United States, where he would remain till his death  aged 89. He is remembered as one of the most respected citizens of Knox, Indiana, USA.

References 

1838 births
1926 deaths
People with dwarfism
Chinese people
American circus performers
19th-century circus performers
20th-century circus performers